The House of Nakashidze is a noble family in Georgia, one of the princely houses hailing from the province of Guria.

History 
In the Principality of Guria, they held the hereditary office of Receivers of Ambassadors, as well as the bailiffship (mouravi) of Shemokmedi, Ozurgeti, and Chochkhati. After the Russian annexation of Guria (1828), the family was received among the princely nobility of the Russian Empire (December 6, 1850). The family produced several military figures and bureaucrats in the Imperial Russian service into the 20th century.

Notable members 
 Liza Nakashidze-Bolkvadze (1885–1938), a Social-Democratic politician
 Nino Nakashidze (1872–1963), a writer
 Iveri Nakashidze (2006)
Prince Alexander Davidovich Nakashidze (1837 – 1905), Russian imperial general
Prince Mikhail Alexandrovich Nakashidze (1873 – 1906), Russian imperial officer
Giorgi Nakashidze

References 

Noble families of Georgia (country)
Georgian-language surnames
Surnames of Georgian origin